Stratz also spelled Strätz  is a German, Slovak surname. Notable people with the surname include:

Carl Heinrich Stratz, German-Russian gynecologist
Mike Stratz, American golf course architect
Hans-Peter Stratz, German Olympic wrestler
Rudolph Stratz, German author
Ursula Strätz, German actress
Stephen Stratz, American Engineer, Of German Descent (Co-Owner Of AsicNorth, Inc ) 
Victor Strätz Quintino, Brazilian, Of German Descent ( NASA Space Apps Winner, 2019, Florianópolis. Hackathon )